Lee Eun-sang (born October 26, 2002), also known by the mononym Eunsang, is a South Korean singer and actor. He is currently a member of Younite. He is also a former member of X1 which debuted in 2019. He debuted as a solo artist on August 31, 2020, with his single album Beautiful Scar.

Career

2019: Produce X 101 and X1

In 2019, Eunsang competed on the show Produce X 101 representing Brand New Music alongside Kim Si-hun, Yun Jung-hwan, and Hong Seong-jun, now of BDC. In the show's finale, he was made a member of the show's debut lineup in the 'X' position, making him a member of the group X1. He made his debut with the group on August 27, 2019, and amidst the Mnet voting manipulation scandal, the group ultimately disbanded on January 6, 2020.

2020–present: Solo career and debut with Younite
On August 31, 2020, Eunsang made his solo debut with the single album Beautiful Scar. For the lead single, "Beautiful Scar", he collaborated with Park Woo-jin.

In October, Eunsang collaborated with former X1 groupmate Kim Woo-seok for the single "Memories".

On August 16, 2021, it was announced that Eunsang will be releasing his second single album Beautiful Sunshine and its lead single "Lemonade" on September 1.

On February 14, 2022, it was announced that Eunsang will be part of Brand New Music's upcoming boy group Younite. On April 20, 2022, he debuted as a member of Younite with the release of their first extended play Youni-Birth.

Discography

Single albums

Singles

As lead artist

Other releases

Guest appearances

Filmography

Television series

Web series

Television shows

Music video

Awards and nominations

Notes

References

External links 
 
 

Living people
2002 births
21st-century South Korean  male singers
South Korean male idols
Reality show winners
People from Jeju Province
Brand New Music artists